Wurmlingen is a suburban district of Rottenburg am Neckar in the administrative district of Tübingen in Baden-Württemberg (Germany). It is famous for its chapel, located atop a hill, which is the subject of a famous poem by Ludwig Uhland.

Geography

Wurmlingen is located 4 km (2.5 mi) northeastern from Rottenburg and 8 km (5 mi) southwestern from Tübingen in valley of the Neckar.

Extent

The area of the district is 714 hectares. Thereof fall 68.6% upon agriculturally used area, 15.1% upon forest area, 15.1% upon settlement area and roads, 0.1% upon water expanse and 1.1% upon other.

Neighbour localities

The territories of the following localities adjoin to Wurmlingen, they are called clockwise beginning in the north: Unterjesingen, Hirschau, Rottenburg (Town), Wendelsheim. All bordering localities are in the administrative district of Tübingen. Unterjesingen and Hirschau are suburban districts of Tübingen, Wendelsheim belongs to Rottenburg.

Population

Wurmlingen has 2487 residents (31/01/08). It is the second largest suburb of Rottenburg. At an area of 7.14 km² (2.8 sq mi) this corresponds to a population density of 348 people per km², or 902 per sq mi.

Faiths

The population is predominantly Roman Catholic.

References

External links

 Official Webpage (German)

Rottenburg am Neckar